The Movement of Democratic Forces of Casamance (MFDC) is the main separatist movement in the Casamance region of Senegal, founded in 1982. It was supported by Guinea-Bissau President João Bernardo Vieira until he was overthrown in 1999. It relies mainly on the Jola people. Its armed wing was formed in 1985 and is called Atika (Diola for "the combatant").

Its leader was Father Augustin Diamacoune Senghor, who died on 13 January 2007. Senghor signed a peace agreement with the government of Senegalese President Abdoulaye Wade in 2004. However, several factions of the MFDC refused to participate in the peace deal and continued their fighting. This division has deeply divided Casamance's independence movement.

Involvement in the Gambian constitutional crisis

The movement was rumored to have involved itself militarily in the 2016–2017 Gambian constitutional crisis and the subsequent ECOWAS military intervention in the Gambia on Yahya Jammeh's side.

Flag 
Recent photos indicate that MDFC - or, at least, one of its armed branches - uses a new flag, designed with a different geometrical arrangement of the elements of the flag adopted in 1983. The flag is horizontally divided green-yellow with a red triangle placed along the hoist, charged with a white star tilted to the upper hoist.

See also
 Casamance conflict
 Politics of Senegal

References

Bibliography 

Casamance
Guerrilla organizations
Rebel militia groups in Africa
Separatism in Senegal
Political parties established in 1982
1982 establishments in Senegal
Paramilitary organisations based in Senegal